Gearóid Morrissey (born 17 November 1991) is an Irish former professional footballer who played as a central midfielder for Cork City over two spells, with a brief stint in between at Cambridge United, where he made his debut against Manchester United.

Club career
Morrissey joined Blackburn Rovers' youth setup in 2008, aged 16, after playing for local side Ringmahon Rangers. He returned to Ireland two years later, and signed for Cork City. 

Morrissey made his debut on 29 May 2010, coming on as a late substitute in a 0–1 home loss against Athlone Town for the First Division championship. He achieved promotion to the Premier Division in 2011, appearing regularly, and was an ever-present figure for the club in the following campaigns.

On 22 December 2014 Morrissey moved to League Two's Cambridge United. He made his U's debut on 3 February 2015, replacing Luke Chadwick in the 51st minute of a FA Cup 0–3 loss against Manchester United at Old Trafford.

It was announced he had re-signed for home club Cork City on 10 December 2015, ahead of the 2016 season.

Morrissey announced his retirement from professional football on 2 December 2021 after 335 professional appearances, scoring 30 goals.

International career
Morrissey represented Republic of Ireland in the under-17 and under-19 levels.

Career statistics
Professional appearances – correct as of 2 December 2021.

References

External links
 Cork City official profile
 
 
 

1991 births
Living people
Sportspeople from Cork (city)
Republic of Ireland association footballers
Association football midfielders
Cork City F.C. players
Cambridge United F.C. players
Republic of Ireland youth international footballers
English Football League players
League of Ireland players